Rodrigo Horacio Jara Santana (born 9 April 1985) is a retired Chilean footballer.

He began his career at Universidad de Chile, where was champion of the 2009 Torneo Apertura with Sergio Markarián on the head as coach.

Honours

Club
Universidad de Chile
Primera División de Chile (1): 2009 Apertura

References

External links
 
 
 

1985 births
Living people
Chilean footballers
Cobresal footballers
Puerto Montt footballers
Deportes La Serena footballers
Santiago Morning footballers
Universidad de Chile footballers
C.D. Arturo Fernández Vial footballers
Deportes Concepción (Chile) footballers
Deportes Copiapó footballers
Chilean Primera División players
Primera B de Chile players
Association football fullbacks